Granulifusus vermeiji is a species of sea snail, a marine gastropod mollusk in the family Fasciolariidae (common name the "tulip snails and spindle snails" and their allies).

Description
The shell size is 52 mm

Distribution
This species has been found at  a depth of 100 m at Balut Island, Mindanao, Philippines

References

 Snyder M.A. 2003. The genera Simplicifusus and Granulifusus (Gastropoda: Fasciolariidae) with the description of two new species in Granulifusus. Journal of Conchology 38(1): 87-93
 Hadorn R. & Fraussen K. 2005. Revision of the genus Granulifusus Kuroda & Habe 1954 with description of some new species (Gastropoda: Prosobranchia: Fasciolariidae). Archiv für Molluskenkunde 134 (2): 129-171

External links
 

Fasciolariidae
Gastropods described in 2003